Bathinda district is in Malwa region of  Punjab, India. The district encompasses an area of 3,385 square kilometers. By area, Bathinda district is the second-largest in Punjab, after Ludhiana District. It is bounded by Faridkot district and Moga district on the north, Muktsar district on the west, Barnala and Mansa districts on the east, and the state of Haryana on the south. Bathinda is cotton producing belt of Punjab.

History
The district of Bathinda came into existence with the formation of the PEPSU in 1948.  It had its headquarters at Faridkot, which were shifted to Bathinda in 1952.

Demographics
According to the 2011 census Bathinda district has a population of 1,388,525, roughly equal to the nation of Eswatini or the US state of Hawaii. This gives it a ranking of 352nd in India (out of a total of 640). Its population growth rate over the decade 2001–2011 was 17.37%. Bathinda has a sex ratio of  865 females for every 1000 males, and a literacy rate of 69.6%. Scheduled Castes made up 32.44% of the population.

At the time of the 2011 census, 89.56% of the population spoke Punjabi and 8.61% Hindi as their first language.

Administration

Bathinda is divided into the 4 tehsils of Bathinda, Rampura Phul, Maur and Talwandi Sabo. These tehsils are further divided into the nine blocks of Bathinda, Sangat, Nathana, Rampura, Phul, Maur, Balianwali, Bhagta Bhai ka and Talwandi Sabo.

Politics

References

External links 

 
 Full history from ancient times to current times

 
Districts of Punjab, India
1948 establishments in India